Pat Welsh may refer to:

Pat Welsh (actress) (1915–1995), Patricia Welsh, American film actress
Pat Welsh (sports journalist) (born 1957), head of sports for Seven News in Brisbane
 Pat Welsh (author) (born 1929), Patricia Welsh, television performer, columnist, garden editor, public speaker, and author

See also
Patrick Welsh (disambiguation)